Lanthanum forms several alloys with nickel, including LaNi5, La2Ni7, LaNi2, LaNi3, La2Ni3, LaNi and La3Ni etc.

LaNi5 

LaNi5 is an intermetallic compound with a CaCu5 structure. It belongs to the hexagonal crystal system. It can be oxidized by air above 200 °C, and react with hydrochloric acid, sulfuric acid or nitric acid above 20 °C. LaNi5 can be used as a catalyst for hydrogenation reactions.

Other alloys 

In addition to LaNi5, there are other alloys such as La2Ni7, LaNi2, LaNi3, La2Ni3, LaNi, and La3Ni, and nonstoichiometric alloys such as LaNi2.286 (tetragonal, space group I4̄2m). The nickel atoms in LaxNiy can also be replaced by other atoms, such as LaNi2.5Co2.5.

See also 
 List of named alloys

References 

Nickel alloys
Intermetallics
Nickel compounds
Lanthanum compounds